A Noise Severe is a live recording by Dutch rock band The Gathering, released on 31 October 2007, on the group's own record label, Psychonaut Records. The album was recorded at Teatro Caupolicán, Santiago, Chile, on 24 March 2007. The live recording was released in a 2xDVD package with an accompanying 2xCD package available separately.

A Noise Severe showcases The Gathering's heavier side, and is a companion to their 2005 2xDVD semi-acoustic release, A Sound Relief.

Track listing 
DVD
Disc 1
 "Shortest Day" –  4:41
 "In Between" – 4:35
 "Liberty Bell" – 5:30
 "Probably Built In The Fifties" – 6:46
 "Even The Spirits Are Afraid" – 6:04
 "Saturnine" – 4:24
 "Monsters" – 5:32
 "Alone" – 4:48
 "A Noise Severe" – 7:35
 "Leaves" – 5:41
 "Eléanor" – 6:43
 "In Motion #1" – 6:07
 "Waking Hour" – 6:02
 "On Most Surfaces" – 6:34
 "Strange Machines" – 6:35
 "Adrenaline" – 4:34
 "Third Chance" – 4:59
 "Black Light District" – 16:18
 "Travel" – 9:43

Disc 2
 Homemade – a studio documentary by Danyael Sugawara & Camiel Zwart
 The 3 winning video of the Alone contest
 Videoclip of Forgotten
 Box and Waking Hour projection clip
 Edison 'thank you' videoclip
 The making of A Noise Severe

CD

References

External links 

The Gathering (band) video albums
2007 video albums
Live video albums
2007 live albums